The 18th Canadian Comedy Awards, presented by the Canadian Comedy Foundation for Excellence (CCFE), honoured the best live, television, film, and Internet comedy from 1 July 2016 to 31 December 2017.

Canadian Comedy Awards, also known as Beavers, were awarded in 22 categories determined by votes from the public and industry members.

TV series Kim's Convenience led with a record thirteen nominations followed by the feature Another WolfCop with five.  Web series You Got Trumped was the big winner, receiving three Beavers from its four nominations.

Reorganization and awards

The Canadian Comedy Awards (CCA) award excellence in Canadian comedy at home and abroad.  Due to a delay in the previous awards season, these awards also covered an 18-month period, from 1 July 2016 to 31 December 2017, in order to return to annual eligibility.  This edition of the awards consolidated the number of categories to 22, largely by combining separate male and female performance categories.

Industry members chose the nominees in each category.  Each industry member could declare one category as their field of "expertise", giving their nomination and vote in that single category three times the normal weight.  After nominations closed, voting was opened for the top five nominees in each category.  13 categories were open to public voting and 9 were exclusively decided by industry members.

Winners and nominees
Winners are listed first and highlighted in boldface:

Multimedia

Live

Television

Internet

Multiple wins
The following people, shows, films, etc. received multiple awards

Multiple nominations
The following people, shows, films, etc. received multiple nominations

References

External links
Canadian Comedy Awards official website

Canadian Comedy Awards
Canadian Comedy Awards
Awards
Awards
Awards
Awards